Painted Faces (Chinese: 七小福) is a 1988 Hong Kong biographical drama film co-written and directed by Alex Law and starring Sammo Hung as his mentor, Master Yu Jim-yuen of the China Drama Academy. For his portrayal as Master Yu, Hung won his second Hong Kong Film Award for Best Actor at the 8th Hong Kong Film Awards. The film was selected as the Hong Kong entry for the Best Foreign Language Film at the 62nd Academy Awards, but was not accepted as a nominee.

The Chinese title refers to the Seven Little Fortunes, which includes Hung, Yuen Biao, Jackie Chan and their fellow opera-mates, who later became popular in the Hong Kong film industry. The film focuses on Master Yu and his methods on bringing up his protégés.

Cast
Sammo Hung as Master Yu
Lam Ching-ying as Wah
Cheng Pei-pei as Ching
John Shum as Stagehand (guest appearance)
Wu Ma as Film Director (guest appearance)
Mary Li as Cheng Lung's mother (guest appearance)
Chung Kam-yuen as Teenage Samo
Yeung Yam-yin as Child Samo
Cheung Man-lung as Teenage Cheng Lung
Siu Ming-fui as Child Cheng Long
Joseph Koo as Child Yuen Biao
Wong Kim-wai as Teenage Yuen Biao

Reception
Marc Savlov of Austin Chronicle gave the film 3½ stars out of 5 and said that: "Despite the fact that the film lags a bit in its second half [...], Painted Faces remains a charming, gorgeously lensed slice of Hong Kong history, and certainly one that no Jackie Chan/Samo Hung/Yuen Biao fan should pass up."

Accolades

See also
List of submissions to the 62nd Academy Awards for Best Foreign Language Film
List of Hong Kong submissions for the Academy Award for Best Foreign Language Film

References

External links

1988 films
1988 drama films
Best Feature Film Golden Horse Award winners
1980s Cantonese-language films
Golden Harvest films
Hong Kong drama films
Films based on actual events
Films directed by Alex Law
Films about Peking opera
Films set in Hong Kong
Films set in the 1960s
Films shot in Hong Kong
Films whose director won the Best Director Golden Horse Award
Shaw Brothers Studio films
1980s Hong Kong films